O'Higgins is a Chilean commune in Capitán Prat Province, located around O'Higgins Lake in the south east of Aisén Region. The commune is administered by the municipality in Villa O'Higgins, the principal settlement.

Demographics
The population grew by 37.4% (126 persons) between the 1992 and 2002 censuses.

Administration
As a commune, O'Higgins is a third-level administrative division of Chile administered by a municipal council, headed by an alcalde who is directly elected every four years. The 2008-2012 alcalde is José Fica Gómez (PDC).

Within the electoral divisions of Chile, O'Higgins is represented in the Chamber of Deputies by René Alinco (PDC) and David Sandoval (UDI) as part of the 59th electoral district, which includes the entire Aisén Region. The commune is represented in the Senate by Antonio Horvath Kiss (RN) and Patricio Walker Prieto (PDC) as part of the 18th senatorial constituency (Aisén Region).

References

External links
  Municipality of O'Higgins

Communes of Chile
Populated places in Capitán Prat Province